The Rotortec Cloud Dancer I is a German autogyro, designed and produced by Rotortec of Görisried, Allgäu. The aircraft is supplied as a complete ready-to-fly-aircraft.

Design and development

The Cloud Dancer I features a single main rotor, a single-seat enclosed cockpit with a bubble canopy, tricycle landing gear with wheel pants and a twin cylinder, air-cooled  Hirth two stroke engine mounted in pusher configuration. The  twin-cylinder air-cooled in-line, two stroke, aircraft engine Hirth 3203 has also been employed.

The aircraft fuselage and tail are made from aluminum and Kevlar composites. Electric trim and an electronic instrument panel are standard equipment.

Aircraft on display
Hubschraubermuseum Bückeburg

Specifications (Cloud Dancer I)

References

External links

2000s German sport aircraft
Single-engined pusher autogyros